The Turner Turnpike is a toll road in central Oklahoma, connecting its two largest cities, Oklahoma City and Tulsa. Authorized by the Oklahoma Legislature in 1947 and opened in May 1953, it is the oldest of the state's eleven turnpikes. The route is signed as Interstate 44 for its entire length, but was constructed prior to its designation as such. The Turner Turnpike was named after Governor Roy J. Turner, who pushed for efforts to build this toll road to connect the state's two largest cities.

Route description 
The route begins north of Oklahoma City, as Interstates 35 and 44 and SH-66 approach it from the south. I-35/SH-66 split to the north, and I-44 begins its journey eastward as the Turnpike. (Traffic may also travel west at this point, along the John Kilpatrick Turnpike.) It ends  later, southwest of Tulsa, at a junction with SH-66.

In addition to the Oklahoma City and Tulsa entrance points on the turnpike, other interchanges are located in Wellston, Chandler, Stroud, Bristow, near Kellyville and Sapulpa. Toll plazas are located at each of those interchanges. The toll plaza at Bristow was the first of the new plazas reconstructed incorporating "state-of-the-industry" electronic toll collection (ETC) and other operational features for the convenience and safety of motorists utilizing the turnpike system. Additional toll plazas, similar in design, were subsequently reconstructed at Chandler, Stroud, Kellyville, and Sapulpa.

Future
On August 2, 2021, the Oklahoma Transportation Commission approved the designation of the portion of the Turner Turnpike from its western terminus to the Kickapoo Turnpike as part of an extension of Interstate 240, forming a beltway around Oklahoma City. ODOT Director Tim Gatz stated in the Transportation Commission meeting that the numbering change was primarily to aid in navigation using digital mapping and routing applications. Gatz also said, "If you look at the Interstate 240 designation on the loop around the Oklahoma City metropolitan area, we are finally to the point where we have a truly contiguous route there that can shoulder the burden of some of that transportation need in a loop format. That's common practice across the country, and you'll see that in many of the metropolitan areas, and that update will really be beneficial as far as everything from signage to how do you describe that route on a green-and-white sign." The designation must be approved by the American Association of State Highway and Transportation Officials (AASHTO) and the Federal Highway Administration (FHWA) to take effect.

Tolls
A two-axle vehicle currently pays $5 ($3.90 with Pikepass) to drive the full length of the Turnpike. (In 2005 dollars, the toll was $9 in 1953.) However, despite being paid off, the Turner Turnpike will remain tolled, as Oklahoma does not toll its roads on a "per road" basis, instead pooling all toll revenue to apply toward paying off all such projects. This is called cross-pledging, which has allowed OTA to build many turnpikes that would not be economically feasible alone.

The Turner Turnpike (as well as the Will Rogers Turnpike on the other side of Tulsa) uses a somewhat unusual tolling system. The Turnpike has only one barrier toll plaza, located northeast of Stroud, at which drivers pay the full toll and are issued a receipt. If one exits before reaching this plaza or enters at an interchange past the plaza, the toll for the portion traveled is collected at the interchange. If one's desired exit is located after the plaza, the motorist pays the full toll at the barrier plaza, then presents their receipt at the ramp for a refund of the untraveled portion. If one enters at an interchange before the main plazas, a ticket is issued at the ramp and presented at the barrier plaza; the fare for the untraveled portion is deducted from the full toll. Travelers exiting the turnpike westbound at Wellston or Luther, eastbound at Kellyville, as well as at the two termini do not receive any refund. This system was implemented in 1992.

OTA is in the process of converting all tolling to a cashless system.

Services
Full service areas featuring McDonald's restaurants and EZ-GO gas stations are located eastbound just east of Chandler and westbound near Stroud. The Stroud facility is located in the median and previously served both eastbound and westbound traffic until June 2020 when the new Chandler service area opened. Future plans call for reconstruction of the Stroud service area in the same general location as the existing facility. The turnpike will also be reconstructed to make the new westbound service area a right-hand exit off the turnpike. 

Full service areas featuring similar amenities as the Stroud Service Area were previously located eastbound at Bristow and westbound at Wellston. The fuel stations at these locations closed in 2007, and the McDonald's restaurants were closed and demolished ca. 2011. A westbound gas station near Heyburn was closed in June 2017 in anticipation of a major turnpike reconstruction project and an eastbound gas station at Chandler was closed following the opening of the new eastbound Chandler service area. These five service areas were originally Howard Johnson's restaurants and full-service Phillips 66 stations, but changed to their current configurations in the 1980s as was the case with concession areas along other Oklahoma turnpikes.

Law enforcement along the Turner Turnpike is provided by Oklahoma Highway Patrol Troop YB, a special troop assigned to the turnpike.

Exit list
Exit numbers follow I-44.

See also
 Oklahoma Turnpike Authority
 Pikepass

References

External links

 Turner Turnpike Toll/Fares Chart - Oklahoma Turnpike Authority

Toll roads in Oklahoma
Tolled sections of Interstate Highways
Interstate 44
U.S. Route 66 in Oklahoma
Transport infrastructure completed in 1953
Transportation in Oklahoma County, Oklahoma
Transportation in Lincoln County, Oklahoma
Transportation in Creek County, Oklahoma
1953 establishments in Oklahoma